Middle Fork Little Snake River is a  tributary of the Little Snake River in Routt County, Colorado.  It flows from a source near the Continental Divide in Routt National Forest to a confluence with the North Fork Little Snake River that forms the Little Snake River.

See also
 List of rivers of Colorado
 List of tributaries of the Colorado River

References

Rivers of Colorado
Rivers of Routt County, Colorado
Tributaries of the Colorado River in Colorado